Ricwin (Ricuin, Richwin) (died 923), was a Count of Verdun.

After the death of Lothar II, the Treaty of Meerssen (August 870) divided Lotharingian territories between Louis the German and his half-brother Charles the Bald. This division allocated “comitatum… Viridunense" to Charles, and Ricwin is recorded as Comte in Verdun in a charter dated 895. Evrard has speculated that Ricwin was the brother of Reginar, but this remains unproved.

The chronicler Flodoard of Reims recorded that in 921, Ricwin (Ricuni infidelis) opposed Charles the Simple, presumably as part of the Revolt of the Nobles of 920. Ricwin, weak in bed, was killed in 923 by Boso of Provence, uncle of Rudolf, who was elected King of France that same year. The murder was apparently instigated by his stepson Adalberon, later Bishop of Metz. Ricwin was succeeded as Count of Verdun by his son Otto.

Personal life
Ricwin first married an unnamed daughter of Engelram, Chamberlain to Charles the Bald, and his wife Friderada. He had his wife beheaded for her unchastity. They had one son:

 Otto (d. 943), Count of Verdun and Duke of Lorraine

Ricwin's second wife was Cunigunda, granddaughter of Louis the Stammerer and widow of Wigeric of Lotharingia. No children are recorded, though there is speculation by Evrard that Cunigunda's son Gilbert (Giselbert) was fathered by Ricwin.

References 
 Medieval Lands Project, Comtes de Verdun
 Flodoard, Les Annales de Flodoard, Paris, 1905
 Evrard, Jean-Pol, Les comtes de Verdun aux Xe et XIe siècles, Publications de la Section historique de l'Institut Grand-Ducal de Luxembourg 95 (1981)
 Reuter, Timothy (editor), The New Cambridge Medieval History, Volume III: c.900-c.1024, Cambridge University Press, Cambridge, 1999, pp. 314–315

Counts of Verdun
923 deaths
Year of birth unknown
Place of birth unknown
9th-century French people
10th-century French people